Ulyana Olyegovna Trofimova (Uzbek: Ульяна Олеговна Трофимова; born 28 February 1990 in Navoiy Province) is an Uzbekistani rhythmic gymnast.

Career 

Trofimova took up gymnastics at age five in Navoiy, Uzbekistan and currently trains in Novogorsk center in Moscow. She won the silver medal in all-around at the 2010 Asian Games. She had her highest placement at the 2010 World Championships in Moscow finishing 12th in the All-around and was awarded the Alina Kabaeva Prize. 

Trofimova competed in the individual all-around event at the 2012 Summer Olympics with a both injured ankles, which prevented her to fight for a top 10 spot she went to be placed 20th in qualifications. She retired after the end of the 2012 season.

Personal life 
Trofimova is studying at the Moscow State Pedagogical University.

Routine Music Information

References

External links
 
 
 
 

1990 births
Living people
Uzbekistani rhythmic gymnasts
Olympic gymnasts of Uzbekistan
Gymnasts at the 2012 Summer Olympics
Asian Games medalists in gymnastics
Gymnasts at the 2010 Asian Games
Asian Games silver medalists for Uzbekistan
Medalists at the 2010 Asian Games
21st-century Uzbekistani women